Prodiamesinae is a subfamily of midges in the non-biting midge family (Chironomidae).

Extant genera & species
Genus Compteromesa Saether, 1981
C. oconeensis Saether, 1981
Genus Monodiamesa Kieffer, 1922
M. bathyphila (Kieffer, 1918)
M. depectinata Saether, 1973
M. ekmani (Brundin, 1949)
M. prolilobata Saether, 1973
M. tuberculata Saether, 1973
Genus Odontomesa Pagast, 1947
O. ferringtoni Saether, 1985
O. fulva (Kieffer, 1919)
O. lutosopra (Garrett, 1925)
Genus Prodiamesa Kieffer, 1906
P. cubita Garrett, 1925
P. olivacea (Meigen, 1818)
P. rufovittata Goetghebuer, 1932

Extinct genera 

 †Cretadiamesa Veltz et al, 2007
 C. arieli (Lebanese amber, Barremian)
 †Libanodiamesa Veltz et al, 2007
 L. deploegi Veltz et al, 2007 (Lebanese amber, Barremian)
 L. simpsoni Baranov et al. 2018 (Wealden amber, Wessex Formation, Barremian)
 †Paicheleria Azar and Nel 2010
 P. magnifica (Lebanese amber, Barremian)

References

Chironomidae
Nematocera subfamilies